Wilhelm Bernhard Max Rose (4 February 1902 – 16 June 1978) was a German actor. He appeared in more than one hundred films from 1936 to 1978.

Selected filmography

References

External links 

1902 births
1978 deaths
German male film actors